USS Trefoil was a 370-ton steamer purchased  by the Union Navy at the last year of the American Civil War.

Trefoil, with a crew of 44 and a powerful Parrott rifle, was a respectable gunboat; but, the American Civil War was coming to a close, and she was relegated to the role of dispatch boat.

Service history 

Trefoil—a wooden-hulled screw steamer built in 1864 by clipper ship designer Donald McKay—was purchased by the Union Navy on 4 February 1865 and commissioned at the Boston Navy Yard, Boston, Massachusetts, on 1 March 1865, Acting Master Charles C. Wells in command. Trefoil proceeded south to the Gulf of Mexico and arrived at Mobile Bay on 24 March. She served in the West Gulf Blockading Squadron under Rear Admiral Henry Knox Thatcher through the end of the Civil War, operating mainly as a dispatch boat between Pensacola, Florida, and Mobile, Alabama. In July 1865, she returned north to the Boston Navy Yard where she was decommissioned on 30 August 1865. Placed in ordinary in 1866, the steamer was sold at auction on 28 May 1867 to a Mr. L. Litchfield.

References 

Ships of the Union Navy
Steamships of the United States Navy
Gunboats of the United States Navy
Dispatch boats of the United States Navy
American Civil War patrol vessels of the United States
1864 ships